This article details the 2012 Durand Cup Quarter-Finals.

The group stage features 12 teams: the 8 automatic qualifiers and the 4 winners of the preliminary stage. 

The teams are drawn into four groups of three, and play each once. The matchdays were between 23 August to 28 August.

The top teams in each group advanced to the Semi-Finals.

Group A

Group B

Group C

Group D

References

External links 

Durand Cup website 

Quarter-Finals